Bostoner Rebbe may refer to:

 Pinchos Dovid Horowitz, the first rebbe of the Bostoner hasidim

 Levi Yitzchak Horowitz, son of Pinchos Dovid Horowitz

 Mayer Alter Horowitz, Bostoner rebbe of Jerusalem, 2nd son of Levi Yitzchak Horowitz

 Naftali Yehuda Horowitz, Bostoner rebbe of Boston, 3rd son of Levi Yitzchak Horowitz

Chaim Avrohom Horowitz, Bostoner rebbe of New York and Beit Shemesh